The Colorado Media School is a private, for-profit college located in Lakewood, Colorado. It is an affiliate campus of the Ohio Center for Broadcasting. The Colorado Media School first opened in Colorado in 2001. It is currently located in the Belmair shopping district in Lakewood, Colorado. The college offers a certificate program that is designed to take 36 weeks to complete. The Tuition and Fees in 2015 cost $16,465 and 88% of program graduates took out loans.

References

Private universities and colleges in Colorado
Education in Lakewood, Colorado
Mass media in Colorado
Educational institutions established in 2001
2001 establishments in Colorado